Black coffee is coffee without creamer or milk.

Black coffee or Black Coffee may also refer to:

Music
 Chorny Kofe (Russian for Black Coffee), Russian heavy metal band

Albums
 Black Coffee (Peggy Lee album), 1956
 Black Coffee (Johnny "Hammond" Smith album), 1962
 Black Coffee (Ann Savoy album), 2010
 Black Coffee (Beth Hart and Joe Bonamassa album), 2018

Songs
 "Black Coffee" (1948 song), written by Sonny Burke, the lyrics by Paul Francis Webster 
 "Black Coffee" (All Saints song), 2000
 "Black Coffee" (Lacy J. Dalton song), 1990
 "Black Coffee" (Ike & Tina Turner song), a 1972 song covered by:
 Humble Pie on their 1973 album Eat It
 Rival Sons on their 2015 album Hollow Bones
 "Black Coffee", a 1984 song by Black Flag from the album Slip It In
"Black Coffee", a 1995 song by Less Than Jake from their album Pezcore

People
 Black Coffee (DJ) (born 1976), a South African DJ

Literature, theater, and film
 Black Coffee (play), a 1930 play by Agatha Christie
 Black Coffee (1931 film), a British detective film based on Agatha Christie's play
 Black Coffee (novel), a 1998 novelisation by Charles Osborne of Agatha Christie's play
 Black Coffee (2021 film), a Malayalam drama film
 Black Coffee Blues, a 1992 book written by Henry Rollins